Chromodoris nona is a species of colourful sea slug, a dorid nudibranch, a marine gastropod mollusc in the family Chromodorididae.

Distribution 
This marine species was described from a single specimen collected at  depth at Amadaiba, Sagami Bay, Japan, . It has been reported from Hong Kong and locations in Japan including Osezaki.

Description
Chromodoris nona is a translucent white chromodorid nudibranch with an opaque white edge to the mantle. There are conspicuous white glands embedded in the mantle margin. The rhinophores and the gills are yellow-orange in colour. The length of the body attains .

References

Chromodorididae
Gastropods described in 1953